Fall protection is the use of controls designed to protect personnel from falling or in the event they do fall, to stop them without causing severe injury. Typically, fall protection is implemented when working at height, but may be relevant when working near any edge, such as near a pit or hole, or performing work on a steep surface. Many of these incidents are preventable when proper precautions are taken, making fall protection training not only critical, but also required for all construction workers. Fall Protection for Construction identifies common hazards and explains important safety practices to help ensure every team member is prepared to recognize fall hazards on the job and understand how to keep themselves and others safe.

There are four generally accepted categories of fall protection: fall elimination, fall prevention, fall arrest and administrative controls.  According to the US Department of Labor, falls account for 8% of all work-related trauma injuries leading to death. Federal statutes, standards and regulations in the United States pertaining to the requirements for employers to provide fall protection are administered by OSHA.

Falls in the workplace 
Falls from elevations were the fourth leading cause of workplace death from 1980 through 1994, with an average of 540 deaths per year accounting for 10% of all occupational fatalities. 42% of all construction workers' deaths occur from falling.

Falls are a concern for oil and gas workers, many of whom must work high on a derrick.  A study of falls over the period 2005–2014 found that in 86% of fatal falls studied, fall protection was required by regulation, but it was not used, was used improperly, or the equipment failed.  Many of the fatalities were because, although the workers were wearing harnesses, they neglected to attach them to an anchor point.

Types of fall protection 
In most work-at-height environments, multiple fall protection measures are used concurrently.

Fall elimination 
Fall elimination is often the preferred way of providing fall protection.  This entails finding ways of completing tasks without working at heights.

Fall prevention 
 Fall guarding is the use of guard rails or other barricades to prevent a person from falling. These barricades are placed near an edge where a fall-hazard can occur, or to surround a weak surface (such as a skylight on a roof) which may break when stepped on.
 Fall restraint is a class of personal protective equipment to prevent persons who are in a fall hazard area from falling, e.g., fall restraint lanyards. Typically, fall restraint will physically prevent a worker from approaching an edges.
Fall protection safety harnesses (see standard EN 361: Personal protective equipment against falls from a height. Full body harnesses)

Fall arrest 

Fall arrest is the form of fall protection that stops a person who has fallen.

Administrative controls 
Administrative controls are used along with other measures, but they do not physically prevent a worker from going over an edge. Examples of administrative controls include placing a safety observer or warning line near an edge, or enforcing a safety policy which trains workers and requires them to adhere to other fall protection measures, or prohibiting any un-restrained worker from approaching an edge.

References

Occupational safety and health
Risk management in business
Safety engineering
Environmental social science
Working conditions
Safety